Pentanema squarrosum, known as ploughman's-spikenard, is a species of plant in the family Asteraceae found in Europe, North Africa, and the Near East.

It is a tall, hairy plant (to 1.2 m) that grows on calcareous, low-nutrient, well-drained soils.  It is a short lived perennial plant. Before flowering, the basal rosette of leaves resembles those of foxgloves. It flowers after mid-summer in Europe, from July to September. When in flower, the plant has many small flowerheads grouped together into a flat-topped structure that resembles a  single flowerhead (pseudanthium). The individual flowerheads have prominent yellow disc florets and no (or inconspicuous) ray florets.

References

External links
photo of herbarium specimen at Missouri Botanical Garden, collected in Spain

squarrosum
Flora of Europe
Flora of Asia
Flora of North Africa
Plants described in 1836